IndiaCo is an Indian-American retail chain that operates nine grocery stores and five restaurants in the Dallas-Fort Worth metroplex, one store in the Atlanta metropolitan area, and one shopping mall in Naperville, Illinois, the biggest Indian-American mall in the United States.

History 
Anand and Gopal Pabari, brothers, opened the first India Bazaar grocery store in 2004 in Plano, Texas, which was then expanded in 2010. The company expanded to include the Rajula's Kitchen restaurant chain. The chain expanded to Frisco, Texas in 2014 and opened a second location in Plano in 2017.

Mall of India 
In March 2018, IndiaCo announced it would be acquiring the abandoned Walmart building in Naperville, Illinois. The building has been transformed into the new Mall of India shopping mall. The mall includes 26 vendors and a food court with 10 restaurants. It also includes the former abandoned Sam's Club building housing a banquet hall and an entertainment center.

The mall, operating under the IndiaCo name, opened on July 23, 2020.

Locations 
The stores operate under the name of IndiaCo except for the locations in Texas, where they are named India Bazaar.
 Plano, Texas Super Center (built 2004)
 Valley Ranch, Irving, Texas (built 2009)
 Richardson, Texas (built 2011)
 Irving, Texas Super Center
 Frisco, Texas (built 2014)
 Lewisville, Texas (built 2016)
 West Plano, Texas (headquarters, built 2017)
 Little Elm, Texas (built 2019)
 Naperville, Illinois (opened 2020)
 Johns Creek, Georgia (built 2021)
 North Frisco, Texas (built 2021)
 Allen, Texas (under construction)
 Schaumburg, Illinois (under construction)

Tenants 
The Mall of India food court has several restaurants including Hot Breads, Saravana Bhavan Express, and Kerala Express. The food for the restaurants One Mean Chicken and Surya Tiffins  are made by robots Indra and Sena.

References 

Companies based in Plano, Texas
Indian-American culture
Retail companies established in 2004
Supermarkets of the United States
Naperville, Illinois
2004 establishments in Texas
Indian-American culture in Texas
Indian-American culture in Illinois